Vasantrao Naik Government Institute of Arts and Social Sciences (VNGIASS), in Nagpur, India, established in 1885 as Morris College, is one of the oldest colleges in the country.  It takes its name from the former Chief Minister of Maharashtra, the late Vasantrao Naik, who was an alumnus of the college.  VNGIASS is currently affiliated to Rashtrasant Tukadoji Maharaj Nagpur University.

History
Although Nagpur was capital of Central Provinces, there was no college there in 1882, when, under the leadership of Sir Bipin Krishna Bose, Mukund Balkrishna Buti, Madhao Rao Gangadhar Chitanavis and others, the Committee of the Neill City High School of Nagpur took the initiative, and collected the sum of Rs 19,000 and started a college at Nagpur in memory of Sir John Morris. 
Later they formed The Nagpur Morris College Association, and they approached the Chief Commissioner of the Central Provinces to established a college, which was eventually established in June 1885.

VNGIASS was affiliated to Calcutta University until 1904, and later to Allahabad University. In 1923 it was one of six colleges affiliated to Nagpur University

After hundred years of existence, the college was renamed as Vasantrao Naik Government Institute of Arts and Social Sciences, by Chief Minister Sudhakarrao Naik, in 1985. This was in honour of Shri Vasantrao Naik, his uncle, who served the longest tenure as the Chief Minister of Maharashtra.

VNGIASS today
The college has grown steadily over the years, from only 21 students in 1885, to 1142 students in 1960.  Today there are more than 3,000 students.

See also
 Shri Vasantrao Naik Government Medical College

References

External links
Official website

Colleges affiliated to Rashtrasant Tukadoji Maharaj Nagpur University
Rashtrasant Tukadoji Maharaj Nagpur University
Universities and colleges in Nagpur
Educational institutions established in 1885
1885 establishments in India
Universities and colleges in Maharashtra